The Stevenson House, is a historic two-story  Spanish Colonial style building located at 530 Houston Street in Monterey, California. It was a boarding house called the French Hotel, built circa 1836. The Scottish author Robert Louis Stevenson lived there in 1879, writing and courting his future wife. It is now a museum and property of the Monterey State Historic Park. The building was listed on the National Register of Historic Places on January 7, 1972. The building is also listed as a California historical landmark #352.

History

The original adobe was built in circa 1836 by Don Rafael Gonzalez, who was the customs administrator at the Port of Monterey. Some of the walls are of chalk rock, which were laid up in mud mortar. Other waslls are of wood frame. The exterior walls are plastered with limestone mortar. The bracketed overhanging roof has wood shingles.

From 1856 to 1870s, merchant Juan Girardin operated a general store on the first floor and lived upstairs. Some additions were made and spare bedrooms were rented, when it became the French Hotel.

In the Autumn of 1879, Scottish novelist Robert Louis Stevenson stayed at the French Hotel. Stevenson lived there while recovering from Ill health as he was crossing the United States to court his future wife Fanny Osbourne. While at the hotel, he dined at a nearby restaurant run by Frenchman Jules Simoneau which was located at what is now the Simoneau Plaza. It was at the hotel that Stevenson wrote The Amateur Emigrant; The Pavilion on the Links; Prince Otto; essays on Henry David Thoreau and the Japanese reformer Yoshida Torajiro; The Old Pacific Capitol; and inspiration for Treasure Island.

In 1937, the hotel was purchased by Edith C. van Antwerp and Mrs. C. Tobin Clark to preserve it as a memorial to Stevenson. They bestowed it to the State of California and it was restored as a home representing the  Spanish Colonial period. The hotel was later named the Stevenson House in honor of Robert Louis Stevenson. It holds a large collection of Stevenson papers and Stevenson memorabilia. It features a bas relief depicting the author writing in bed.

An outside kiosk provides information about the Stevenson House, Robert Louis Stevenson, and directions to visit the Monterey State Historic Park website for more information.

See also
 National Register of Historic Places listings in Monterey County, California
 California Historical Landmarks in Monterey County

References

External links 
 

 Robert Louis Stevenson House
 Guide to the Stevenson House Collection

Monterey, California
Buildings and structures in California
Buildings and structures in Monterey County, California
Buildings and structures in Monterey, California
Houses in Monterey County, California
Historic house museums in California
Museums in Monterey County, California
Literary museums in the United States
Houses on the National Register of Historic Places in California
Houses on the National Register of Historic Places in Monterey County, California
National Register of Historic Places in Monterey County, California
History of Monterey County, California
History of the Monterey Bay Area